SS Ben Doran was a steam fishing trawler that operated out of Aberdeen, Scotland. It was launched in 1900 and operated until its wrecking on the Ve Skerries, Shetland, on 29 March 1930, which claimed the lives of the full crew, believed to number nine crew members. Its wrecking has been called "the most tragic wreck in all Shetland's history".

Description 
Ben Doran was built by shipbuilders Hall, Russell & Company of Aberdeen, and it was launched on 3 March 1900.

Wrecking 
On 29 March 1930, the Aberdeen steam trawler Ben Doran ran aground on the north end of Heligoblo, Ve Skerries, northwest of the island of Papa Stour, Shetland, in bad weather and rough sea conditions, due in part to poor coverage in nautical charts of the area, and lack of knowledge of the tides around the shallow reef surrounding the Ve Skerries which were considered unpredictable even to experienced Shetland fishermen. Another passing trawler brought news of the accident to Lerwick by 5pm, after which the Stromness Lifeboat Station in Orkney was notified, and Board of Trade's life-saving apparatus - a rocket propelled rope to shoot to another vessel, to allow for it to be towed to safety - was arranged and taken by lorry to Ronas Voe. The apparatus was taken aboard the steam trawler Arora and it departed towards the Ve Skerries at 2am on 30 March.

Honorary Secretary of the RNLI's Lerwick branch, George Theodore Kay, who was aware of the geography of the Ve Skerries, thought that a ship the size of Arora would struggle to come close enough to Ben Doran to effect a rescue attempt. He learned that a smaller motor boat named Smiling Morn was berthed in Voe, Delting, and suggested that this vessel accompanied by a four-oared rowing boat would have a better chance at success. He, with John Falconer, master of the trawler Boscobell, and W. H. Dougall from The Missions to Seamen proceeded to Voe and enrolled the assistance of Smiling Morn. They headed for Housa Voe, Papa Stour to procure the expertise of someone there with experience of the seabed around the Ve Skerries. By entering Housa Voe in rough conditions and during the night, they themselves nearly collided with a sunken rock. Upon landfall in Housa Voe they enlisted the assistance of John Henderson, and headed towards the Ve Skerries.

Smiling Morn arrived before 5am at the Ve Skerries, which Arora had reached first. Heavy seas and high winds continued and proved to make a very difficult rescue attempt. Five of Ben Doran'''s crew were seen clinging to the ship's rigging while sea spray hit them. Arora made an approach, however they only reached in far enough that their crew thought that they would not be able to return to safety, and still Ben Doran was out of reach. Retreating, they relayed that an additional two crewmembers were spotted in the rigging. Kay, who examined the area 2 months later, commented that it was "abundantly clear that rescue would have been hopeless".

At one point a "tide lump" (Shetland dialect: a rapid escalation of tidal activity) fell into the  rowing boat which Smiling Morn had in tow, and it sank. Smiling Morns skipper, John Jamieson, was adamant in attempting a rescue despite the danger to his own crew, and due to this a fight nearly broke out upon the ship, leading the rest of the crew to tie him up to keep him from doing so. Despite the effort put in by the crew of each of the would-be rescue vessels, they resolved that nothing more could be done and so they abandoned the rescue.

The Stromness Lifeboat Station was alerted to the unsuccessful attempt by 4pm 30 March. By 4:45pm the Stromness Lifeboat departed, reaching Scalloway by 7:30am on 31 March. By the time the lifeboat arrived at the Ve Skerries, only the gallows for supporting the ship's anchor could be seen. All of the nine crew members believed to have been on board were killed. The wrecking of Ben Doran and the deaths of the crew validated the need for a lifeboat to be stationed in Shetland. In 1933 the Aith Lifeboat Station was opened.

The wreck of the Ben Doran is used as a dive site for sport divers and underwater photographers.

 See also 

Ve Skerries
List of shipwrecks in 1930
List of shipwrecks of the United Kingdom

References

Sources

 External links 
 Shetland Museum and Archives - photographs related to Ben Doran''

1900 ships
Ships sunk in collisions
Wreck diving sites in Scotland
Ships lost with all hands
Steamships of the United Kingdom
Ships built by Hall, Russell & Company
Fishing vessels of the United Kingdom
World War I merchant ships of the United Kingdom
Fishing history of Shetland
Trawlers
Maritime incidents in 1930
1930 in Scotland